"It's Gotta Be You" is the debut and winner's single by Isaiah, the farewell season winner of The X Factor Australia. "It's Gotta Be You" was written by Anthony Egizii and David Musumeci and was released digitally immediately after it was announced he had won, on 21 November 2016 as the lead single from his self-titled debut album. The song debuted and peaked at number 26 on the ARIA Singles Chart. As of September 2019 the song has gained over 230 million streams on Spotify and was certified platinum in 2018.

Live performances
Isaiah performed "It's Gotta Be You" live for the first time during The X Factor grand final announcement show on 21 November 2016. He reprised the song after he was announced as the winner. "This has been my dream, and I can't believe it came true on my birthday," Firebrace said after the announcement. Isaiah performed the song live on The Morning Show on 22 November 2016.

Chart performance
"It's Gotta Be You" debuted on the Australian ARIA Singles Chart at number 26, from three days of sales. It is the lowest debut for an Australian X Factor winner's single and first to miss the ARIA top 10.

Track listing

Charts

Weekly charts

Year-end charts

Certifications

Release history

References

2016 songs
2016 debut singles
Songs written by David Musumeci
Songs written by Anthony Egizii
Song recordings produced by DNA Songs
Sony Music Australia singles
Isaiah Firebrace songs